Dina Naz is a Pakistani politician from Kohat District, who served as a member of the 10th Khyber Pakhtunkhwa Assembly, belonging to the Pakistan Tehreek-e-Insaf.

Education
Naz earned a Master of Arts degree in Master of Business Administration and human resource management.

Political career
Dina Naz was elected as the member of the Khyber Pakhtunkhwa Assembly on Reserved Seats for Women from Constituency WR-09 in 2013.

References

1964 births
Living people
Khyber Pakhtunkhwa MPAs 2013–2018
Women members of the Provincial Assembly of Khyber Pakhtunkhwa
People from Kohat District
Pakistan Tehreek-e-Insaf politicians
21st-century Pakistani women politicians